Bert C. Marley (born May 1, 1948) is an American politician and education. He served as chair of the Idaho Democratic Party from August 2015 to March 16, 2019. He previously served as a member of the Idaho Senate and Idaho House of Representatives.

Early life and education 
Marley was born in Provo, Utah. He received a Bachelor of Arts in German language from Idaho State University in 1973, and his Masters of Education from Utah State University in 1996.

Career 
Marley worked as a teacher at Marsh Valley High School for 23 years.

Idaho Legislature 
Marley served in the Idaho House of Representatives from 1998 through 2001 and in the Idaho State Senate from 2001 through 2006.

In 2006, he ran against Jana Jones in the Democratic Party primary election for Superintendent of Public Instruction, and lost earning 44.6% of the vote.

In 2014, Marley was unopposed for the Democratic primary for Lieutenant Governor of Idaho. He was defeated by the Republican incumbent, Brad Little, earning only 32.9% of the vote.

Idaho Democratic Party 
He was the chair of the Idaho Democratic Party from August 2015 to March 16, 2019.

The largest Democratic caucus in the nation happened during his tenure in Ada County.

During Marley's tenure, Sally Boynton Brown served as the party's executive director.

Personal life 
Marley lives in McCammon, Idaho. He and his wife, Michelle, have two children.

References

External links

|-

|-

|-

1948 births
Schoolteachers from Idaho
Democratic Party Idaho state senators
Idaho State University alumni
Living people
Democratic Party members of the Idaho House of Representatives
People from Bannock County, Idaho
Politicians from Provo, Utah
Utah State University alumni
State political party chairs of Idaho